Oldham West was a parliamentary constituency centred on the town of Oldham in the north-west of Greater Manchester.  It returned one Member of Parliament (MP)  to the House of Commons of the Parliament of the United Kingdom.

The constituency was created for the 1950 general election, and abolished for the 1997 general election.

History

Boundaries

1950–1983: The County Borough of Oldham wards of Coldhurst, Hartford, Hollinwood, Werneth, and Westwood, and the Urban District of Chadderton.

1983–1997: The Metropolitan Borough of Oldham wards of Chadderton Central, Chadderton North, Chadderton South, Failsworth East, Failsworth West, Hollinwood, and Werneth.

Members of Parliament

Elections

Elections in the 1950s

Elections in the 1960s

Elections in the 1970s

Elections in the 1980s

Elections in the 1990s

References

Parliamentary constituencies in North West England (historic)
Constituencies of the Parliament of the United Kingdom established in 1950
Constituencies of the Parliament of the United Kingdom disestablished in 1997
Politics of the Metropolitan Borough of Oldham